Anarsia lewvanichae is a moth in the family Gelechiidae. It was described by Kyu-Tek Park and Margarita Gennadievna Ponomarenko in 1996. It is found in Thailand.

The wingspan is about 10.5 mm. The forewings are yellowish white speckled brown scales and a large dark brown costal mark. The hindwings are grey.

References

lewvanichae
Moths described in 1996
Moths of Asia